Social intelligence is the capacity to know oneself and to know others. Social intelligence is learned and develops from experience with people and learning from success and failures in social settings. Social intelligence is the ability to understand your own and others actions. It is also known as "tact" or "common sense", or "street smarts". It is an important interpersonal skill that will help individuals succeed in all aspects of their lives.

Definitions
Social scientist Ross Honeywill postulates that social intelligence is an aggregated measure of self- and social-awareness, evolved social beliefs and attitudes, and a capacity and appetite to manage complex social change. Neuropsychologist Nicholas Humphrey believes that it is social intelligence that defines who we are as humans.

The original definition (by Edward Thorndike in 1920) is "the ability to understand and manage men and women and boys and girls, to act wisely in human relations". It is thus equivalent to interpersonal intelligence, one of the types of intelligence identified in Howard Gardner's theory of multiple intelligences, and closely related to theory of mind.

An updated definition coined by Nancy Cantor and John F. Kihlstrom in 1987 is “the individual's fund of knowledge about the social world." More recently in 2006 Professor Eleni Andreou described social intelligence as being similar to "social skills and competence"

Social intelligence and interpersonal intelligence were previously believed to be closely related, however, the two subjects diverged into two unique fields of study.

Other authors have restricted the definition to deal only with knowledge of social situations, perhaps more properly called social cognition or social marketing intelligence, as it pertains to trending socio-psychological advertising and marketing strategies and tactics. According to Sean Foleno, social intelligence is a person's competence to optimally understand one's environment and react appropriately for socially successful conduct.

The multiple definitions listed indicate there is yet to be a consensus on the operational definition of social intelligence.

Hypothesis
The social intelligence hypothesis states that social intelligence, that is, complex socialization such as politics, romance, family relationships, quarrels, collaboration, reciprocity, and altruism,
(1) was a driving force in developing the size of human brains or "executive brains"
(2) today provides our ability to use those large brains in complex social circumstances.

This hypothesis claims that the demands of living together is what drives our need for intelligence, and that social intelligence is an evolutionary adaptation for dealing with highly complex social situations, as well as gaining and maintaining power in social groups.

Archaeologist Steve Mithen believes that there are two key evolutionary periods of human brain growth that contextualize the social intelligence hypothesis. The first was about two million years ago, when the brain more than doubled in size. Mithen believes that this growth was because people were living in larger, more complex groups, and had to keep track of more people and relationships. These changes required a greater mental capacity and, in turn, a larger brain size.

The second key growth period in human brain size occurred between 600,000 and 200,000 years ago, when the brain reached its modern size. While this growth is still not fully explained, Mithen believes that it is related to the evolution of language. Language may be the most complex cognitive task we undertake. Language is directly related to social intelligence because it is primarily used to mediate social relationships.

Social intelligence was a critical factor in brain growth. Social and cognitive complexity co-evolve.

Measurement
The social intelligence quotient (SQ) is a statistical abstraction, similar to the ‘standard score’ approach used in IQ tests, with a mean of 100. Scores of 140 or above are considered to be very high. Unlike the standard IQ test, it is not a fixed model. It leans more toward Jean Piaget's theory that intelligence is not a fixed attribute, but a complex hierarchy of information-processing skills underlying an adaptive equilibrium between the individual and the environment. Therefore, an individual can change their SQ by altering their attitudes and behavior in response to their social environment.

SQ has until recently been measured by techniques such as question and answer sessions. These sessions assess the person's pragmatic abilities to test eligibility in certain special education courses; however, some tests have been developed to measure social intelligence. This test can be used when diagnosing autism spectrum disorders. This test can also be used to check for some non-autistic or semi-autistic conditions such as semantic pragmatic disorder or SPD, schizophrenia, dyssemia and ADHD.

Some social intelligence measures exist which are self-report. Although easy to administer, there is some question as to whether self-report social intelligence measures would better be interpreted in terms of social self-efficacy (that is, one's confidence in one's ability to deal with social information).

Since low SQ individuals may not have skills necessary to communicate with customers and/or co-workers, they are most successful with minimal customer interaction, smaller groups, or independent work. People with SQs over 120 are considered socially skilled, and may work exceptionally well with jobs that involve direct contact and communication with other people.

George Washington University Social Intelligence Test: Is one of the only ability measures available for assessing social intelligence and was created in June 1928 by Dr.Thelma Hunt a psychologist from George Washington University. It was originally proposed as a measurement of a person's capacity to deal with people and social relationships. The test is designed to assess various social abilities which consisted of observing human behavior, social situation judgement, name & face memory and theory of mind from facial expressions. The George Washington University Social Intelligence Test revised second edition consists of items as quoted:
 Observation of human behavior
 Recognition of the mental state of the speaker
 Memory for names and faces
 Judgment in social situations
 Sense of humor

Differences from intelligence
Nicholas Humphrey points to a difference between intelligence being measured by IQ tests and social intelligence. Some autistic children are extremely intelligent because they have well developed skills of observing and memorizing information, however they have low social intelligence. For a long time, the field was dominated by behaviorism, that is, the theory that one could understand animals including humans, just by observing their behavior and finding correlations. But recent theories indicate that one must consider the inner structure behavior.

Digital age 
Social intelligence has declined in the digital age. Previously individuals would engage in conversations with people next to them in line or on the train but now they are often looking at their smartphones. Since social intelligence is learned and takes practice, experts are worried that the increase in digital communication will harm social intelligence skills.

Additional views
Social intelligence is closely related to cognition and emotional intelligence.
Research psychologists studying social cognition and social neuroscience have discovered many principles in which human social intelligence operates. In early work on this topic, psychologists Nancy Cantor and John Kihlstrom outlined the kinds of concepts people use to make sense of their social relations (e.g., "What situation am I in?, What kind of person is this?, Who is talking to me?"), the rules they use to draw inferences ("What did he mean by that?") and plan actions ("What am I going to do about it?").

More recently, popular science writer Daniel Goleman has drawn on social neuroscience research to propose that social intelligence is made up of social awareness (including empathy, attunement, empathic accuracy, and social cognition) and social facility (including synchrony, self-presentation, influence, and concern). Goleman's research indicates that our social relationships have a direct effect on our physical health, and the deeper the relationship the deeper the impact. Effects include blood flow, breathing, mood such as fatigue and depression, and weakening of the immune system.

It is believed that intelligence is amplified by increased social interactions as declared by researcher Raymond H. Hartjen. This suggests that children require continuous opportunities for interpersonal experiences in order to develop a keen 'inter-personal psychology'. Traditional classrooms do not permit the interaction of complex social behavior. Instead, students in traditional settings are treated as learners who must be infused with more and more complex forms of information. The structure of schools today allows very few of these skills, critical for survival in the world, to develop. Because we so limit the development of the skills of "natural psychologist" in traditional schools, graduates enter the job market handicapped to the point of being incapable of surviving on their own. In contrast, students who have had an opportunity to develop their skills in multi-age classrooms and at democratic settings rise above their less socially skilled peers. They have a good sense of self, know what they want in life and have the skills to begin their quest.

The issue here is psychology versus social intelligence—as a separate and distinct perspective, seldom articulated. An appropriate introduction contains certain hypothetical assumptions about social structure and function, as it relates to intelligence defined and expressed by groups, constrained by cultural expectations that assert potential realities, but make no claims that there is an "exterior" social truth to be defined. This perspective pursues the view that social structures can be defined with the warning that what is mapped into the structure and how that information is stored, retrieved, and decided upon are variable, but can be contained in an abstract and formal grammar—a sort of game of definitions and rules that permit and project an evolving intelligence. Two halves of the coin: one half psychology; the other half social. Unfortunately, most references to social intelligence relate to an individual's social skills. Not mentioned, and more important, is how social intelligence (speaking of a group or assembly of groups) processes information about the world and shares it with participants in the group(s). Are there social structures or can they be designed to accumulate and reveal information to the individual or to other groups. The bigger question is how groups and societies map the environment (ecological, social and personal) into a social structure. How is that structure able to contain a worldview and to reveal that view to the participants? How are decisions made?

J. P. Guilford was the first researcher to approach the problem of social intelligence from the measurement viewpoint. He had developed a test of social intelligence, and suggested that the social intelligence is a unit, that does not depend on common intellectual factor, but related with the comprehension of behavioral information.

See also

References

External links
The Social Intelligence Lab
 The Preeminent Intelligence – Social IQ, Raymond H. Hartjen
 Socially superior, Times Online
 The Social Brain, Social Neuroscience
 Social Intelligence: the New Science of Success, Dr. Karl Albrecht, Wiley 2005.
The Social Intelligence Profile – self-assessment instrument by Dr. Karl Albrecht.
Daniel Goleman's blog and current research
 Social Intelligence, John Kihlstrom and Nancy Cantor, in R.J. Sternberg (Ed.), Handbook of intelligence, 2nd ed. (pp. 359–379). Cambridge, U.K.: Cambridge University Press.

 A Treatise on Messaging and Society Today: The Genesis of the Social Intelligence Architect and the Advent of the Integrated Media Services Organization (IMSO).

Intelligence by type
Interpersonal relationships
Personality theories
Life skills